

Quarter-final 1

Quarter-final 2

Quarter-final 3

Quarter-final 4

Quarter finals
2003–04 in Israeli basketball
2003–04 in Lithuanian basketball
2003–04 in Spanish basketball
2003–04 in Italian basketball
2003–04 in Serbian basketball